An independent unions is a trade union that represents workers in one plant or company and is free of employer control. (This includes a union representing workers in more than one plant located in two or more states but employed by the same employer). In North America, a national independent union is a union of a national character not affiliated with the AFL or CIO; a local independent union is one of a local character not affiliated with the international union having jurisdiction over that branch of industry.

See also 
 
 National Federation of Independent Unions
 United Electrical, Radio and Machine Workers of America

References

Further reading 

 

Trade unions